Héctor Ariel Bustamante López (born 31 March 1995) is a Paraguayan footballer who plays as a forward for Pelotas.

Career

Novo Hamburgo

Atlético Goianiense (loan)
On 30 April 2019 Atlético Goianiense signed Bustamante on loan from Novo Hamburgo.

CSA (loan)
On 6 August 2019 CSA signed Bustamante on loan from Novo Hamburgo until the end of 2019 Série A season.

References

External links
 

Living people
1995 births
Paraguayan footballers
Association football forwards
Club Nacional footballers
Club Rubio Ñu footballers
Esporte Clube Novo Hamburgo players
Atlético Clube Goianiense players
Centro Sportivo Alagoano players
Operário Ferroviário Esporte Clube players
Campeonato Brasileiro Série B players
Campeonato Brasileiro Série A players
Expatriate footballers in Brazil
Paraguayan Primera División players